Chernomor Avia was a charter airline based in Sochi, Russia. It was established in 1994 and operates passenger charter services. Its main base was Sochi International Airport.

Code data

ICAO Code: CMK (not current)
Callsign: Cheravia

Fleet

The Chernomor Avia fleet consisted of the following aircraft (at January 2005):

3 Tupolev Tu-134AA
1 Tupolev Tu-154B
1 Tupolev Tu-154B-2

References

External links

Defunct airlines of Russia
Airlines established in 1994
Airlines disestablished in 2006
1994 establishments in Russia
Companies based in Krasnodar Krai